A Chinaman was a ship engaged in the Old China Trade, in the 18th and 19th centuries, by analogy with East Indiaman.

See also
Chinaman (term)
Empress of China, an early American full-rigged ship in the Old China Trade
Guineaman, a ship used to transport slaves from the region of Guinea
East Indiaman, a ship used to transport colonial goods from the East Indies and the Indian Subcontinent
West Indiaman, a ship used to transport colonial goods from the West Indies

Sailing ships
History of foreign trade in China
Tall ships